The Sant Ferran Castle is situated on a hill in Figueres, Catalonia at the end of Pujada del Castell.  It is a large military fortress built in the eighteenth century under the orders of several military engineers, including Pedro Martín  Cermeño and Juan Martín Cermeño. It is the largest monument in Catalonia.

History
Following the negotiation of the Treaty of the Pyrenees in 1659, the Fort de Bellegarde in Le Perthus passed from Spain into the hands of the French state.  That bastion had been the border defense for Spain, so to replace it and stop possible future invasions, it was decided to build a fortress on the hill in Figueres. The first stone was placed on December 13, 1753. The name of Sant Ferran (San Fernando in Spanish) was given in honor of King Ferdinand VI of Spain.

Early in the Peninsular War with France that began in 1808, the castle was captured by the French.  On 9 January 1810 Mariano Álvarez de Castro, hero of the recent Third siege of Girona, was brought to Sant Ferran from Perpignan to be imprisoned.  The following day he was found dead, of a fever, according to the French, poisoned, according to the Spanish. He was buried, wrapped in only a sheet, in the cemetery there.  In 1815 a black marble tablet was placed on his grave which stated that Álvarez had been poisoned, and was a Victim of the Iniquity of the French Tyrant. In December 1823 French troops, ironically invading Spain in order to restore the tottering throne of Ferdinand VII, passed through Figueres, and on the orders of Marshal Moncey, formerly Napoleon's Inspector-General of Police, destroyed the plaque.

On Feb. 1, 1939, Juan Negrín, last prime minister of the Second Spanish Republic, convened in the castle the final meeting on Spanish soil of the Republican Spanish Cortes. A week later, the fortress fell to the forces of Francisco Franco.

From May 1940 to December 1942, Francoist regime used the castle as a concentration camp where returned republicans from France were held. Thousands of prisoners were interned there, most of them to be distributed to other camps.

Architecture
The castle occupies an area of 320,000 m2 within a perimeter of 3120 m, and cisterns located under the courtyard are able to hold up to 10 million liters of water.  At its height, the castle could support 6,000 troops.

After it ceased to be used as a prison in July 1997, it was opened to the public with guided tours to show the characteristics of the fortress. These tours emphasize the sophisticated construction techniques from the military engineering of the time.

Connections
The castle, being situated in the north-west of the town, is more accessible to tourists these days, since the  Figueres Vilafant station has opened on the western edge of the town (the existing station is to the east of the centre).  The castle is a little over 500m from Figueres-Vilafant station (using a footpath).

Citations

External links
 Sant Ferran Castle official website

Castles in Catalonia
Buildings and structures in Figueres
Francoist concentration camps